Cormack is a surname derived from the Irish given name "Cormac", and may refer to:

Science 

 Allan McLeod Cormack, South African-American Nobel prize winner as co-inventor of Computed tomography
 Gordon Cormack, Canadian computer scientist and co-inventor of the DMC data compression algorithm

Film 

 Bartlett Cormack, American actor, playwright, screenwriter, and producer
 Danielle Cormack, New Zealand actress

Literature 

 Patrick Cormack, English politician and writer
 William Cormack, Scottish-Canadian explorer and author

Other fields 

 Arthur Cormack, Scottish Gaelic singer and musician
 Christian Cormack, British rowing cox
 Graham Cormack, Scottish curler
 Joe Cormack, former Australian rules footballer
 John Cormack, Irish sportsman
 Karen Mac Cormack, British/Canadian experimental poet
 Lesley Cormack (born 1957), Canadian historian of mathematics and historian of geography
 Sir Magnus Cormack, Scottish-born Australian politician
 Paul Cormack, former English cricketer
 Peter Cormack, Scottish footballer
 Peter McKenzie Cormack, crew member of the SS Sauternes
 Professor Robert Cormack, British academic
 Professor Robin Cormack, British classicist and art historian.
 Teresa Cormack, New Zealand murder victim

McCormac 
 Carmack
 McCormack

McCormac